Russia at War, 1941–1945 is a 1964 book by British journalist Alexander Werth in which he describes his experiences as the BBC correspondent in the war time Soviet Union, at the same time attempting to provide a fuller picture of the Russia at war.

The reviewers have generally praised Werth for his personal observations, but have been more critical of his research, analysis and use of other sources.

References 

1964 non-fiction books
History books about the Soviet Union
History books about World War II